Speleoithona bermudensis is a species of crustacean in the family Speleoithonidae. It is endemic to Bermuda.  Its natural habitat is karsts.

References

Cyclopoida
Endemic fauna of Bermuda
Freshwater crustaceans of North America
Taxonomy articles created by Polbot
Crustaceans described in 1993